Real is a South Korean neo-noir action film based on a character from Manhwa webtoons superheroes comic book by InfinityOne Comics Entertainment of the same name, produced by InfinityOne Films & Cove Pictures in association with Paradise Group and Chinese company Alibaba Pictures and distributed by CJ E&M. It is the third installment in the InfinityOne Extended Universe (IOEU), directed by Lee Sa-rang, starring Kim Soo-hyun, Sung Dong-il, Lee Sung-min, Sulli and Jo Woo-jin. The film was released on June 28, 2017 in South Korea.

Synopsis 
In the underworld of a fictional city, Jang Tae-yeong (Kim Soo-hyun) is a successful gang boss and owner of a large casino. Disturbed by an entirely different personality that lies within himself, Jang decides to seek the help of Dr. Choi Jin-ki (Lee Sung-min). To help Jang be rid of the other personality, Dr. Choi comes up with an elaborate plan which Jang follows through with, but it yields unexpected consequences. What then ensues is a battle between the real and fake Jang Tae-Yeong.

Cast

Main 
 Kim Soo-hyun as Jang Tae-yeong
 Sung Dong-il as Jo Won-geun
 Lee Sung-min as Dr. Choi Jin-ki
 Choi Jin-ri as Song Yoo-hwa
 Jo Woo-jin as Sa Do-jin

Supporting 

 Lee Gyung-young as No Yeom
 Kim Hong-pa as Choi Nak-hyeon
 Han Ji-eun as Han Ye-won
 Rich Ting as Ryu Gil-soo
 Choi Kwon as Head of Department Baek
 Park Gyeong-ree as Restaurant Waitress	
 Jung Yi-seo as Secret room club addict
 Park Min-jung as Private hospital room nurse
 Jung In-gyeom as Professor Kim 
 Lee Sang-hoon
 Yoon Ji-kyeon
 Yoon Kyung-ho as Broker
 Hyun Bong-sik as Chinese gangster
 Ko Kyu-pil

Cameo appearances 
 Suzy as Song Yoo-hwa's best friend 
 Lee Ji-eun as Awards ceremony guide
 Kim Da-som as Rehabilitation therapist
Ahn So-hee as Chinatown's sewing room worker 
Park Seo-joon as Dressed-up bodyguard
Son Hyun-joo as Patient with disability
Nam Kyung as Casino Waitress 
Park Min-ha as Siesta's serving fairy

Groups
 Yumemiru Adolescence
 Akari Yamada - Sakura Yoshida
 Yuumi Shida - Hitomi Orii
 Karin Ogino - Yuka Okubo
 Kyouka (singer) - Nana Yasuda
 Cute (Japanese idol group)
 Maimi Yajima - Reika Izumi
 Saki Nakajima - Nanami Ozaki
 Airi Suzuki - Akane Okada
 Chisato Okai - Yuko Oguro
 Mai Hagiwara - Saaya Mizuno

Production 
On October 12, 2015, Alibaba Pictures signed an agreement at the 20th Busan International Film Festival to fund the film. Paradise Group also co-invested with additional . It also filmed in the corporation's resort, Paradise City.
Director Lee Jung-sub dropped out of the film and was replaced by Lee Sa-rang, first-time filmmaker, owner of the production company of Real.
Filming began on January 3, 2016 and ended on June 30, 2016 in Paradise City, Yeongjongdo, Incheon.

Release 
The film was released cinematically on 28 June 2017, and later digitally in mid-July in South Korea.

Taiwan became the first region outside of South Korea to have a cinematic release of the film, on 4 August 2017. It was released in Hong Kong on 16 November 2017 and in Japan on 14 April 2018.

Reception
Real received mostly negative reviews during its initial release. MaxMovies review stated that despite Kim Soo-hyun giving justice to his dual roles, the film's plot is non-existent, the editing and special effects are amateurish, in addition to its action scenes being boring. One critic felt the story was confusing and named the film "one of the most distastrous films ever made".

One critic proclaims Real to be a "future camp cult classic" that "is the 'real' deal". Sitges Film Festival, one of the world's foremost international festivals specialising in fantasy and horror films, has included Real in its 2017 catalogue.  The experimental adventure that is Real is in Kim Soo Hyun's words, not an endearing film that is easy for moviegoers to fall in love with. Yet, in the end, love it or hate it, there is no denying that Real is "one of the most singular Korean films to emerge in years".

When Real was released for Digital Cable TV VOD and IPTV subscription in South Korea, it topped the charts at its initial release. In contrast to its box office response, the movie fared reasonably well on the VOD chart. While it is released via VOD platform only in mid July, the movie ranked quite high on the overall chart of July 2017.

Real received positive reviews upon its opening in Taiwan in early August.  Critics praised Kim Soo Hyun’s acting, proclaiming that both main characters, despite looking identical, were easily distinguished through his use of body language, mannerisms, and voice acting.

Expat Korean movie critic/blogger Pierce Conran included Real in his list of top 15 Korean movies of 2017 for its uniqueness and originality.

Box office
Real grossed over $1M NTD (New Taiwan Dollar) in its first weekend of release in Taiwan.  It was the highest initial week box office take for a Korean film at the time. The film grossed over $4.7M NTD in Taiwan.

References

External links 

 Real on Naver
 Real on Daum
 Real on Sitges Film Festival

Films based on South Korean webtoons
2017 action films
South Korean action films
South Korean neo-noir films
CJ Entertainment films
2017 films
2010s South Korean films